Arumugam Pillai Seethai Ammal College, is a general degree college located in Tiruppattur, Sivaganga district, Tamil Nadu. It was established in the year 1965. The college is affiliated with Alagappa University. This college offers different courses in arts, commerce and science.

Departments

Science
Physics
Chemistry
Mathematics
Botany
Zoology
Computer Science
Information Technology

Arts and Commerce
Tamil
English
History
Economics
Business Administration
Commerce

Accreditation
The college is  recognized by the University Grants Commission (UGC).

See also
Education in India
Literacy in India
List of institutions of higher education in Tamil Nadu

References

External links

Educational institutions established in 1965
1965 establishments in Madras State
Colleges affiliated to Alagappa University